Andrea Padula (born 4 April 1996) is a Swiss professional footballer who plays as a left back for Bellinzona. Born in Switzerland, he holds Romanian and Italian passports.

Club career
Andrea Padula started with his youth football playing for AP Campionese in the Italian enclave of Campione d'Italia. He joined FC Lugano and advanced through youth selection Team Ticino to the U-21 team before the 2014/15 season. By the end of the season, the then offensive player had made 20 appearances in the 1st division, the fourth-highest Swiss division, scoring six goals. However, the team were relegated to the fifth-rate 2nd league interregional. In 2015/16 Padula played 17 times in the fifth highest Swiss league, scoring six goals. In the 2016/17 season he was loaned out to second division club FC Chiasso. On 31 July 2016, the 2nd matchday, he made his debut in the second tier Challenge League in a 2-3 defeat against FC Schaffhausen, he was in the starting XI. He became a regular player for the team and played 31 games during that season scoring twice. In the following season he was again loaned to Chiasso for six months. During this period he played as left winger or more often as Left back. During the winter break Padula was loaned out to A.C. Monza for six months. Padula made his professional debut with Monza in a 1-0 Serie C loss to Carrarese on 4 February 2018. Returning to Switzerland Padula transferred from Lugano to Chiassso permanently and played for them for 18 months. During the winter break of the 2019/20 season he transferred to FC Wil under head coach Ciriaco Sforza.

Sforza was hired as head coach by FC Basel for their 2020–21 season and on 11 September 2020 Padula followed Sforza and signed a contract with Basel. Padula played his debut for the club in the away game in the Europa League on 17 September 2020 at the Stadion Gradski vrt in Osijek, Croatia as Basel won 2–1 against NK Osijek to advance to the next round. He made his Swiss Super League debut for the club in the home game in the St. Jakob-Park three days later, on 20 September, as Basel played a 2–2 draw with Vaduz.

Sforza was sacked by Basel in April 2021 and Patrick Rahmen took over the job as head coach ad-interim for the rest of the season and he was then engaged by the club as head coach for the following 2021–22 season. Rahmen and Padula decided that they would part company and the contract was mutually dissolved. During his time with the club, Padula played a total of 28 games for Basel without scoring a goal. 16 of these games were in the Swiss Super League, four in the UEFA Europa League and eight were friendly games.

On 1 September 2022, Padula moved to Bellinzona.

Personal life
Born in Switzerland, Padula is of Italian and Romanian descent. His mother is from Bucharest, Romania, and Padula said that he feels Romanian and his dream is to represent the Romanian national team.

References

External links
 
 SFL Profile

1996 births
People from Mendrisio
Sportspeople from Ticino
Swiss people of Romanian descent
Swiss people of Italian descent
Living people
Swiss men's footballers
Association football midfielders
FC Chiasso players
A.C. Monza players
FC Wil players
FC Basel players
AC Bellinzona players
Swiss Super League players
Swiss Challenge League players
Serie C players